Carol Kendall may refer to
Carol Kendall (writer) (1917–2012), writer of children's books
Carol Kendall (scientist), scientist at United States Geological Survey

See also 
Carroll Kendall (1890–1975), Canadian ice hockey player